The 1915 Ohio State Buckeyes football team represented Ohio State University as a member of the Western Conference and the Ohio Athletic Conference (OAC) during the 1915 college football season. Led by third-year head coach, John Wilce, the Buckeyes compiled an overall record of 5–1–1 and outscored opponents 105–39. Ohio State had a record of 2–1–1 against Western Conference opponents and 3–0 in OAC play.

Schedule

Coaching staff
 John Wilce, head coach, third year

References

Ohio State
Ohio State Buckeyes football seasons
Ohio State Buckeyes football